Dexter Keith McCleon (born October 9, 1973) is a former American football safety who played in the National Football League. He played for the St. Louis Rams, Kansas City Chiefs, and Houston Texans in his ten-year career that started in 1997. In addition to his career in the NFL, McCleon was a volunteer assistant football coach at Meridian High School in his hometown of Meridian, Mississippi.

Early years 

McCleon was an All-American quarterback at Meridian High School in Meridian, Mississippi and was also a star baseball player there and got drafted in the 13th-round by the Minnesota Twins in the 1993 Major League Baseball Draft but decided to play college football in Clemson University as a cornerback and also played baseball at Clemson.

College career
At Clemson, McCleon was a 2 sport star as a quarterback in his early years and also a baseball player.  He also was a First-team All-Atlantic Coast Conference as a senior and got drafted by the St. Louis Rams in the 2nd round, 40th pick, of the 1997 NFL Draft. McCleon is the only player in ACC Football history to be named ACC Player of the Week on Offense, Defense, and Special Teams all in the same season

Professional career

St. Louis Rams
McCleon played with the Rams for six seasons. He was a starter from 1999 to 2001. He helped them reach Super Bowl XXXIV in 2000 in which McCleon had seven tackles vs the Tennessee Titans. McCleon also started at cornerback for the Rams in Super Bowl XXXVI vs the New England Patriots. McCleon is seen on camera during Super Bowl XXXVI saying to his Rams' teammate, Dre Bly, while both were sitting on the bench: "Tom Brady…overrated." referring to Patriots now legendary, but then very new quarterback. In 2001, McCleon led the NFL with 7 interceptions. McCleon was a starter for the Rams in Super Bowls XXXIV and XXXVI at cornerback. In 2002, his last season with the Rams, he lost his starting place to Dre Bly, and in 2003 the Rams released him for salary cap reasons to avoid paying his $3.9 million expected salary.

Kansas City Chiefs
McCleon signed with the Chiefs as a free agent in 2003, signing a five-year $11 million contract. He started for two seasons. In 2003, McCleon lead the NFL with 8 interceptions. In 2005, McCleon played in eleven games as a nickleback, making twenty-one tackles and two interceptions.  On March 10, 2006, the Chiefs cut McCleon in a salary cap cut move.

Houston Texans 
McCleon was signed by the Houston Texans on April 1, 2006. In the 2006 season, he had a good season as a corner for the Texans. He was released on Aug 24, 2007.

NFL statistics

Key
 GP: games played
 COMB: combined tackles
 TOTAL: total tackles
 AST: assisted tackles
 SACK: sacks
 FF: forced fumbles
 FR: fumble recoveries
 FR YDS: fumble return yards 
 INT: interceptions
 IR YDS: interception return yards
 AVG IR: average interception return
 LNG: longest interception return
 TD: interceptions returned for touchdown
 PD: passes defended

Personal life
McCleon finished a 10-year NFL career with 31 career interceptions. After a pro career, he went on to coach for his alma mater Meridian HS Wildcats for 2 years. They were the team to end the Longest Streak in history, that was held by the South Panola Tigers at 89-1. McCleon is single and has 1 son, Dexter Jr., who is 8 years old. He currently resides in Hoover, AL.

References

1973 births
Living people
Sportspeople from Meridian, Mississippi
American football safeties
American football cornerbacks
Clemson Tigers football players
St. Louis Rams players
Kansas City Chiefs players
Houston Texans players